The Cameron Highlands white-bellied rat (Niviventer cameroni), also known as the Cameron Highlands niviventer, is a species of rodent in the family Muridae.

References

Niviventer
Mammals described in 1940
Fauna of Southeast Asia
Rodents of Malaysia
Endemic fauna of Malaysia
Taxa named by Frederick Nutter Chasen